Tang-e Bid (also Romanized as Tang-e Bīd) is a village in Yeylaq Rural District, in the Central District of Buin va Miandasht County, Isfahan Province, Iran. At the 2006 census, its population was 36, in 7 families.

References 

Populated places in Buin va Miandasht County